Vladimir Matsuta is a Ukrainian retired footballer.

Career
Vladimir Matsuta started his career with Cheksyl Chernihiv a club in the city of Chernihiv. Then he played 2 matches with Domostroitel Chernihiv. In 1998 he moved to Desna Chernihiv where he played 18 matches, 4 matches with Domostroitel Chernihiv and 18 matches with Fortuna Cheksyl Chernihiv scoring 19 goals. In 1999 he moved to Desna Chernihiv where he played 13 matches and then he moved to Ros Bila Tserkva where he played 3 matches. In 2001 played 6 matches with Energiya» Chernigov and then he moved to Fakel-GPZ Varva until 2003 where he played 27 matches and scored 6 goals and he won the Chernihiv Oblast Football Championship. In 2004 he played 8 matches with FC Nizhyn and then in 2008 he moved to Desna-2 Chernihiv the reserve squad of Desna Chernihiv here he played 22 matches and scored 6 goals. In 2009 he moved to Yednist-2 Plysky for three seasons where he played 25 matches and scored 6 goals. In 2012 he played 15 matches and scoring 1 goal for ATK Chernihiv.

Coach Career
He has been appointed as SDYuShOR Desna, the young team of Desna Chernihiv.

Private Life
In 2022, his house was sheltered during the Siege of Chernihiv by the Russian Armed Forces during the 2022 Russian invasion of Ukraine. In 12 March 2022 together with Artem Padun, Valentyn Krukovets, Volodymyr Chulanov, Oleksandr Babor, they organized a charity tournamentin Chernihiv Stadium in Chernihiv to organize a donation to reconstruct his house, which was destroyed by the russian troops, during the Siege of Chernihiv.

Honours
Nizhyn
 Chernihiv Oblast Football Championship: 2004

Fakel Varva
 Chernihiv Oblast Football Championship: 2001

References

External links 
 Vladimir Matsuta at footballfacts.ru

1975 births
Living people
Footballers from Chernihiv 
FC Desna Chernihiv players
FC Desna-2 Chernihiv players
FC Cheksyl Chernihiv players
FC Fakel Varva players
FC Ros Bila Tserkva players
Ukrainian footballers
Ukrainian Premier League players
Ukrainian First League players
Ukrainian Second League players
Association football midfielders
SDYuShOR Desna managers